Harry Vega (born September 21, 1965 in New Brunswick, New Jersey) is an American jockey in Thoroughbred horse racing.
 
Vega began his riding career in Michigan in 1983 then in the late 1980s moved to compete at tracks on the Northeast coast of the United States. A winner of more than 3,500 races in his career to date, in 2006 his 22.7 winning percentage was ninth best among all jockeys in the United States.

Harry Vega is best known as the jockey of Xtra Heat. Aboard the filly, he in 2002 he won the Barbara Fritchie Handicap, the Genuine Risk Handicap and Vagrancy Handicap and the Endine Stakes at Delaware Park Racetrack.

After Vega married fellow jockey Amy Duross they were banned by Suffolk Downs officials from riding in the same race until the Massachusetts State Racing Commission ruled they could. Vega now has 2 children with Duross, 15 year old Devin Vega and 13 Year old Tyler Vega.

References

Year-end charts

1965 births
Living people
American jockeys
Sportspeople from New Brunswick, New Jersey